Major John Cockrill (December 19, 1757 - April 11, 1837) was an American settler. A veteran of the American Revolutionary War, he was one of 13 explorers to modern-day Nashville, Tennessee in 1779, and he received a land grant in modern-day Centennial Park in 1784 Cockrill Springs named for him.

Early life
Cockrill was born on December 19, 1757, in Wythe County, Virginia. His father, John Cockrill, was a Welsh-born immigrant of Scottish descent who served in the French and Indian War of 1754-1763 and became a large planter in Richmond County, Virginia.

Career
Cockrill served in the American Revolutionary War of 1775–1783, first under Colonel William Russell and later under Brigadier Lachlan McIntosh. In 1779, he was one of 13 explorer who went down the Cumberland River to modern-day Nashville alongside James Robertson.

Cockrill was granted land in modern-day Nashville in 1784.

Personal life and death
Cockrill married Anne Robertson Johnson Cockrill, the sister of James Robertson. They had eight children, including Mark R. Cockrill. Cockrill built the first brick house in Nashville, on Cedar Street (now Charlotte Avenue). Half Brother was Edward Collinsworth whose son was James Collinsworth a Veteran of San Jacinto

Cockrill died on April 11, 1837, in Nashville.

References

External links

1757 births
1837 deaths
American people of Scottish descent
People from Wythe County, Virginia
People from Nashville, Tennessee
Continental Army soldiers